The 2023 KNSB Dutch Allround Championships in speed skating were held in Heerenveen at the Thialf ice skating rink from Tuesday 27 December to Wednesday 28 December 2022. The tournament was part of the 2022–2023 speed skating season. Patrick Roest and Antoinette Rijpma-de Jong won the allround titles. Patrick Roest won all four distances. Only the top 8 athletes after the 1500 meters were eligible to skate the final distance.
The allround championships were held on the same day as the 2023 KNSB Sprint Allround Championships.

Schedule

Medalists

Men's allround classification

Women's allround classification

 DNS = Did not start
source:

References

KNSB Dutch Allround Championships
KNSB Dutch Allround Championships
2023 Allround